Cross Roads is an unincorporated community in Rankin County, Mississippi, United States.

Cross Roads Church is located in the settlement.

References

Unincorporated communities in Rankin County, Mississippi
Unincorporated communities in Mississippi